Woincourt is a former railway station located in the commune of Woincourt in the Somme department, France.  The station was served by TER Hauts-de-France trains from Le Tréport-Mers to Abbeville. Train services were discontinued in 2018.

See also
List of SNCF stations in Hauts-de-France

References

Defunct railway stations in Somme (department)